is a Japanese football player. She plays for Iga FC Kunoichi Mie. She played for Japan national team.

Early life 
Ogawa was born in Kashima on December 26, 1988.

Career 
After graduating from high school, she joined JEF United Chiba in 2007. In 2010, she moved to INAC Kobe Leonessa. In 2012, she returned to JEF United Chiba. In 2014, she moved to Iga FC Kunoichi.

National team 
In March 2013, Ogawa was selected Japan national team for 2013 Algarve Cup. At this competition, on March 6, she debuted against Norway. She played 3 games for Japan in 2013.

Statistics

References

External links

Iga FC Kunoichi

1988 births
Living people
Association football people from Ibaraki Prefecture
Japanese women's footballers
Japan women's international footballers
Nadeshiko League players
JEF United Chiba Ladies players
INAC Kobe Leonessa players
Iga FC Kunoichi players
Women's association football forwards